Jesús Portillo (born 16 June 1999) is an Argentine professional footballer who plays as a forward for Defensores Unidos.

Career
Portillo got his career underway with Defensores Unidos. He began featuring at senior level in the 2018–19 campaign, making his professional debut on 5 August 2018 in a Copa Argentina defeat to Newell's Old Boys; playing for sixty-six minutes before being substituted for Gianluca Alfenoni. His league bow arrived in August versus Estudiantes as a substitute, though his opening Primera B Metropolitana start didn't arrive until the succeeding December; against Acassuso.

Career statistics
.

References

External links

1999 births
Living people
Place of birth missing (living people)
Argentine footballers
Association football forwards
Primera B Metropolitana players
Defensores Unidos footballers